U-1 may refer to one of the following German submarines:

  (1906), Germany's first U-boat, now preserved in the Deutsches Museum in Munich; served in the First World War as a German training submarine for the Kaiserliche Marine; now a museum ship
 During the First World War, Germany also had these submarines with similar names:
 , a Type UB I submarine launched in 1915; transferred to Austria-Hungary on 12 July 1915 and renamed U-10; sunk on 9 July 1918
 , a Type UC I submarine launched in 1915 and sunk in July 1917
 , a Type IIA submarine that served in the Second World War and was sunk in April 1940
, a Type 201 submarine of the Bundesmarine, launched in 1961 and scrapped in 1967
 , a Type 205 submarine of the Bundesmarine that was launched in 1967 and sold in 1991

U-1 or U-I may also refer to:
 , lead boat of the U-1 class submarines for the Austro-Hungarian Navy

Submarines of Germany